En Kanavar is a 1948 Indian Tamil language film directed by S. Balachander and produced by Ajith Pictures. Balachandar, in addition to directing, also composed the music, sang many of the numbers and starred as the male lead.

Plot

Cast 
 S. Balachander as a wealthy man
 S. Nandini as the wealthy man's cousin
 V. Chellam as the dancer

Production 
Although a Tamil film, En Kanavar was produced by the Bombay-based Ajit Pictures. Its story was written by Chaturbhuj Doshi, and the dialogue by Javar Seetharaman. Shooting took place at Ranjit Studios. In addition to directing and starring, Balachandar sang many of the film's songs which included solo and duets; he composed all of them in Carnatic ragas. The film criticises Western social tendencies and how they disrupt Indian society and traditions.

Release and reception 
En Kanavar was released on 18 February 1948.

References

External links 
 

1940s Tamil-language films
1948 films
Films directed by S. Balachander
Films with screenplays by Javar Seetharaman
Films scored by S. Balachander
Indian black-and-white films